Ŭnch'ŏn County is a county in South Hwanghae province, North Korea.

History
The county was formed in 1952 from Unnyul County.

Administrative divisions
Ŭnch'ŏn county is divided into 1 ŭp (town) and 22 ri (villages):

References

Counties of South Hwanghae